The 1989 Norwegian Football Cup was the 84th edition of the Norwegian Football Cup. The final took place at Ullevaal Stadion in Oslo on 22 October 1989. Viking were in their 8th final (3 wins and 4 runners-up), while Molde were in their second final after losing the 1982 final against Brann and therefore had the chance to win the first trophy in the club's history. The match was drawn and was replayed on 29 October 1989 resulting in a win for Viking.

Calendar
Below are the dates for each round as given by the official schedule:

First round

|colspan="3" style="background-color:#97DEFF"|6 June 1989

|-
|colspan="3" style="background-color:#97DEFF"|7 June 1989

|}

Second round

|colspan="3" style="background-color:#97DEFF"|21 June 1989

|-
|colspan="3" style="background-color:#97DEFF"|22 June 1989

|}

Third round

|colspan="3" style="background-color:#97DEFF"|4 July 1989

|-
|colspan="3" style="background-color:#97DEFF"|5 July 1989

|}

Fourth round

|colspan="3" style="background-color:#97DEFF"|26 July 1989

|-
|colspan="3" style="background-color:#97DEFF"|27 July 1989

|-
|colspan="3" style="background-color:#97DEFF"|Replay: 2 August 1989

|}

Quarter-finals

|colspan="3" style="background-color:#97DEFF"|16 August 1989

|-
|colspan="3" style="background-color:#97DEFF"|Replay: 24 August 1989

|}

Semi-finals

Final

First match

Replay match

See also
1989 Norwegian Football Cup Final
1989 1. divisjon
1989 2. divisjon

References

External links 
 http://www.rsssf.no

Norwegian Football Cup seasons
Norway
Football Cup